József Pecsovszky or Iosif Petschovschi (also known as József Perényi; 2 July 1921 – 6 October 1968), was a Romanian football player. His nickname was Peci. He could play in any position on the pitch, he was even goalkeeper once.

Career
Petschovschi played 273 games in Divizia A, scoring a massive 86 goals. For Romania he won 32 caps, scoring 11 goals.

Petschovschi made his debut in Divizia A at the age of 16, as player of Chinezul Timișoara.

Petschovschi played in the Hungarian Football Championship between 1941 and 1944 under the name of József Perényi, winning the Hungarian title with Nagyváradi AC, and played three times for the Hungarian national team.

His fame was such that in 1946 a Hungarian footballer tried, and even did so for a short while, to steal Petschovschi's identity, when he recommended himself as the real Petschovschi in order to sign a contract with RC Strasbourg of France.

Petschovski was suspended in October 1947 for a period of three months because before an international game between Romania and Poland he bet on the Polish team.

In 1952 he became the first footballer to receive the title of Master of Sport. He was also the first Romanian footballer to be called to play for a World Team alongside the biggest names of football.

In 1952 he moved to Steaua București for three years, before returning to Arad to play for UT Arad until 1961 when he retired from professional football. In 1961 he briefly crossed with his son Jóska, who also played for Arad.

Petschovschi coached UT Arad during the 1962–63 season.

He died of cancer at his home in Arad at the age of 47 on 6 October 1968.

His former club, UT Arad raised him a statue, which can be found at the main entrance of the UTA Stadium.

Honours

Club
Nagyváradi AC
Hungarian Championship League: 1943–44
UTA Arad
Romanian Championship League: 1946–47, 1947–48, 1950
Romanian Cup: 1948
CCA București
Romanian Championship League: 1952, 1953
Romanian Cup: 1952

References

Sources
Oroszhegyi Károly: Pecsovszky – das blonde Wunder, Neue Banater Zeitung, 1978.
Oroszhegyi Károly: Csala, a Szőke Csoda, Jelenkor kiadó, 2000.

External links

 
 
 
 Iosif Petschovski at RSSSF
 

1921 births
1968 deaths
Romanian footballers
Liga I players
Liga II players
CA Oradea players
FC Steaua București players
FC UTA Arad players
Olympic footballers of Romania
Footballers at the 1952 Summer Olympics
Association football forwards
Romania international footballers
Hungarian footballers
Hungary international footballers
Sportspeople from Timișoara
Dual internationalists (football)
Nemzeti Bajnokság I players
Romanian football managers
FC UTA Arad managers
CAM Timișoara players